The Lebanese Futsal League is the top league of futsal in Lebanon. There are 12 teams competing in the league, which operates on a system of promotion and relegation with the Lebanese Futsal League Second Division.

The league was formed in 2007, with Pro's Cafe Beirut winning the first title. The most successful club in the league is Bank of Beirut, with five league titles.

Clubs

Champions

Wins by club

2021–22 season 
The following 12 clubs played in the Lebanese Futsal League during the 2021–22 season.

See also 
 Lebanon national futsal team
 Lebanon women's national futsal team
 Lebanese Premier League

References

futsal
Futsal in Lebanon
Lebanon
Sports leagues established in 2007
2007 establishments in Lebanon